Juan de Solórzano Pereira (1575–1655) was a Spanish jurist who became oidor of Lima and was an early writer on the colonial law of the Spanish empire in the Americas.

Works
Disputatio de Indiarum jure sive de justa Indiarum occidentalium inquisitione (Madrid, 1629).
Disputationum de Indiarum iure, sive de iusta Indiarum occidentalium gubernatione (Madrid, 1639).
Politica indiana: sacado en lengua castellana de los dos tomos del derecho; govierno municipal de las Indias Occidentales (Madrid, 1647).
Emblemata centum regio-politica (Madrid, 1653).

References

External links

Barrientos Grandon, Javier (2003). Juan de Solórzano y Pereyra (1575-1655), retrieved: 2017-03-21. 

1575 births
1655 deaths
University of Salamanca alumni
Academic staff of the University of Salamanca